The 1906 Georgetown Blue and Gray football team represented Georgetown University during the 1906 college football season. Led by Joe Reilly in his third year as head coach, the team went 6–1. Branch Bocock was the team's quarterback.

Schedule

References

Georgetown
Georgetown Hoyas football seasons
Georgetown Blue and Gray football